The 1936 Republican National Convention was held June 9–12 at the Public Auditorium in Cleveland, Ohio. It nominated Governor Alfred Landon of Kansas for president and Frank Knox of Illinois for vice president.

The convention supported many New Deal programs, including Social Security. The keynote address was given on June 9 by Frederick Steiwer, U.S. Senator from Oregon.

Background 

Although many candidates sought the Republican nomination, only two, Governor Landon and Senator Borah, were considered to be serious candidates. Although favorite sons County Attorney Earl Warren of California, Governor Warren E. Green of South Dakota, and Stephen A. Day of Ohio won their respective primaries, the 70-year-old Borah, a well-known progressive and "insurgent," carried the Wisconsin, Nebraska, Pennsylvania, West Virginia, and Oregon primaries, while also performing quite strongly in Knox's Illinois and Green's South Dakota. However, the party machinery almost uniformly backed Landon, a wealthy businessman and centrist, who won primaries in Massachusetts and New Jersey and dominated in the caucuses and at state party conventions.

Other potential candidates included Robert A. Taft, New York Representative James W. Wadsworth, Jr., Michigan Senator Arthur Vandenberg, Iowa Senator Lester Dickinson, New York Representative Hamilton Fish III, New Jersey Governor Harold Hoffman, Delaware Governor C. Douglass Buck, Supreme Court Justice Owen Roberts, Michigan auto magnate Henry Ford, aviator Charles Lindbergh, former President Herbert Hoover, Oregon Senator Frederick Steiwer, Senate Minority Leader Charles McNary, former Treasury Secretary Ogden L. Mills and Theodore Roosevelt, Jr., cousin of Democratic incumbent Franklin D. Roosevelt.

Presidential nomination

Presidential candidates 

At the start of the convention, Landon looked like the likely nominee, but faced opposition from a coalition led by Michigan Senator Arthur Vandenberg, Idaho Senator William E. Borah, and newspaper publisher Frank Knox. However, the stop-Landon movement failed.

Presidential Balloting / 3rd Day of Convention (June 11, 1936)

Vice Presidential nomination

Vice Presidential candidates 

The selection of a vice presidential candidate at the closing session presented some difficulties. The Landon people wanted Vandenberg but the Michigan senator refused repeatedly and firmly.

Colonel Knox, former Ambassador Edge, Colonel Little, and Governor Nice were placed in nomination. It soon became evident the choice of the convention would be Knox as state after state seconded his nomination. Edge, Little, and Nice withdrew their names and the Chicago publisher became the unanimous choice for second place on the ticket.

Vice Presidential Balloting / 4th Day of Convention (June 12, 1936)

See also
 History of the United States Republican Party
 List of Republican National Conventions
 List of presidential nominating conventions in the United States
 U.S. presidential nomination convention
 1936 Republican Party presidential primaries
 1936 United States presidential election
 1936 Democratic National Convention

References

External links 
 Republican Party platform of 1936 at The American Presidency Project

Republican National Conventions
1936 United States presidential election
Republican National Convention
1936 in Ohio
1936 conferences
June 1936 events